Catherine Alexandra Gude (born c. 1965) is a Norwegian model and beauty queen. she is the first delegate from her country to win the Miss International beauty pageant in 1988.

She bested 45 other contestants to win the title in Gifu, Japan.

References

1960s births
Miss International winners
Living people
Norwegian beauty pageant winners
Miss International 1988 delegates